Hardy Otto Nickerson Sr. (born September 1, 1965) is an American former football coach and professional player.  He played as linebacker for four teams over 16 seasons, from 1987 to 2002, in the National Football League (NFL).  Nickerson spent the prime of his career with the Tampa Bay Buccaneers. The hiring of head coaches Sam Wyche and Tony Dungy allowed Nickerson to play in the middle in a 4–3 defense for both coaches; Nickerson played in a 3–4 defense with the Pittsburgh Steelers. While playing in the 4–3, Nickerson went to five Pro Bowls, and was selected for the National Football League 1990s All-Decade Team.

Early life
Nickerson attended Verbum Dei High School, a Catholic school located in Watts, Los Angeles.  He earned a BA degree in sociology from the University of California, Berkeley in 1989.

Broadcasting and coaching
In 2006, Nickerson became the color analyst for the Buccaneer Radio Network, teaming him with the longtime veteran play-by-play man Gene Deckerhoff.

On February 23, 2007, Nickerson  was named linebackers coach of the Chicago Bears, where he coached for his former Tampa Bay position coach, Lovie Smith. On January 8, 2008, he resigned from the Bears due to health issues within his family.

On April 15, 2010, Nickerson was hired as the head football coach at Bishop O'Dowd High School in Oakland, California, a traditional powerhouse that has produced future NFL players such as Tarik Glenn, Langston Walker, Kirk Morrison, and Eric Bjornson. During Nickerson's tenure, he led the Dragons to back to back league titles and was also responsible for producing nearly 20 scholarship athletes in a period of three years. Nickerson stepped down from the head coaching position on November 18, 2013.

Nickerson was named the linebackers coach for the Tampa Bay Buccaneers under Lovie Smith on January 7, 2014.  On January 23, 2016, Nickerson was hired by the San Francisco 49ers as linebackers coach under new head coach Chip Kelly.  On March 10, 2016, Nickerson was hired by the University of Illinois as defensive coordinator under new head coach Lovie Smith.
On October 30, 2018, Nickerson announced his resignation as Defensive Coordinator citing health reasons.

Personal life
His son Hardy Nickerson Jr. is a linebacker who has played in the National Football League for the Cincinnati Bengals and the Minnesota Vikings.

References

External links
 Illinois profile 

1965 births
Living people
American football middle linebackers
California Golden Bears football players
Chicago Bears coaches
Green Bay Packers players
Illinois Fighting Illini football coaches
Jacksonville Jaguars players
National Conference Pro Bowl players
National Football League announcers
Pittsburgh Steelers players
Tampa Bay Buccaneers announcers
Tampa Bay Buccaneers players
High school football coaches in California
Players of American football from Compton, California
African-American coaches of American football
African-American players of American football
Verbum Dei High School alumni
21st-century African-American people
20th-century African-American sportspeople
Ed Block Courage Award recipients